Richard Sirois may refer to:

 Rich Sirois (born 1957), Canadian hockey player
 Richard Z. Sirois (born 1956), Canadian radio personality